Colony Township is a township in Delaware County, Iowa, USA.  As of the 2000 census, its population was 863.

Geography
Colony Township covers an area of 36.29 square miles (94 square kilometers); of this, 0.01 square miles (0.02 square kilometers) or 0.02 percent is water.

Cities and towns
 Colesburg

Unincorporated towns
 Holy Cross
(This list is based on USGS data and may include former settlements.)

Adjacent townships
 Mallory Township, Clayton County (north)
 Millville Township, Clayton County (northeast)
 Liberty Township, Dubuque County (east)
 New Wine Township, Dubuque County (southeast)
 Bremen Township (south)
 Oneida Township (southwest)
 Elk Township (west)
 Elk Township, Clayton County (northwest)

Cemeteries
The township contains four cemeteries: Oak Hill, Platt, Saint Patrick and Zion.

Major highways

References
 U.S. Board on Geographic Names (GNIS)
 United States Census Bureau cartographic boundary files

External links
 US-Counties.com
 City-Data.com

Townships in Delaware County, Iowa
Townships in Iowa